Dudhwa Khara is a village in Churu district in Rajasthan, in northwest India, situated in the Thar Desert and 24  km north from Churu. The historic rural village has large designed havelis, an interesting topography, and camel safaris.

Notable people
 Hanuman Singh Budania - freedom fighter
 Narendra Budania - three-time MP from Churu

References

Villages in Churu district